Augustus James Ulysses "Gus" Jaspert (born 1979) is a British diplomat who was previously the Governor of the British Virgin Islands.  He was sworn into office on 22 August 2017. He left office on 23 January 2021, and was succeeded by John Rankin who was sworn in after completing a 14-day COVID-19 quarantine.

Career and background

From 2001 to 2007 Jaspert worked for Surrey County Council as Lead Manager for Children's Services.  He then spent two years at HM Treasury as part of the Prime Minister's Delivery Unit, followed by three years at the Home Office as Head of Drugs and Alcohol and Head of Policing.  From 2012 to 2014 he worked at 10 Downing Street as Private Secretary to the Prime Minister, David Cameron, after which he spent a year studying at the Royal College of Defence Studies, an institution which grooms public servants who "have the potential to reach the highest ranks". He then spent two years in the Cabinet Office as Director of Security and Intelligence, National Security Secretariat, before taking up appointment as Governor of the British Virgin Islands.

He graduated with a first class degree in History and German from the University of Edinburgh in 2001, and in 2015 was awarded a master's degree with distinction in International Security and Strategy from King's College London.

Governor of the British Virgin Islands

Shortly after being sworn into office as Governor, the British Virgin Islands was struck by Hurricane Irma.  Jaspert declared a state of emergency 16 days after being sworn in, thus becoming the first ever Governor of the British Virgin Islands to exercise that power under the Constitution. Governor Jaspert has been widely praised for his quick response which possibly saved the territory.

Shortly before demitting office Jaspert launched a corruption inquiry in the Territory, appointing Sir Gary Hickinbottom commissioner.  Sir Gary's report concluded that governance in the Territory had been "appallingly bad", and that it was "highly likely" that serious dishonesty had taken place. Jaspert was widely criticised and defamed in one Government-linked online news site, yet the findings of the report confirmed Jaspert had been correct.

Footnotes

Living people
Alumni of the University of Edinburgh
Alumni of King's College London
Governors of the British Virgin Islands
21st-century British diplomats
1979 births